Manj-e Nesa (also Romanized as Manj-e Nesā’ and Monj-e Nesā’; also known as Manj, Monj, Monj Bālā, and  Monj-e Bālā) is a city in Manj District of Lordegan County, Chaharmahal and Bakhtiari province, Iran. At the 2006 census, its population was 661 in 139 households, when it was a village. The following census in 2011 counted 1,486 people in 338 households. The latest census in 2016 showed a population of 1,492 people in 381 households, by which time the village had been elevated to the status of a city. The city is populated by Lurs.

References 

Lordegan County

Cities in Chaharmahal and Bakhtiari Province

Populated places in Chaharmahal and Bakhtiari Province

Populated places in Lordegan County

Luri settlements in Chaharmahal and Bakhtiari Province